System area networks (SAN) are high-performance, connection-oriented networks that link computer clusters. Microsoft SQL Server 2005 uses it for high-performance connectivity through Virtual Interface Adapter (VIA). This technology is used since the advent of Windows 2000.

See also
Storage area network
Virtual Interface Adapter

References

Computer networks